Miloš Dimitrijević (born 16 February 1984 in Belgrade) is a Serbian footballer who last played as a central midfielder for Sydney FC of the Australian A-League. In addition to possessing Serbian citizenship, he also holds French citizenship.

Club career
Born in Belgrade, he arrived in France at the age of 7, with his father, who was the famous football player, the legend of Partizan and Dinamo Zagreb, Zoran "Čava" Dimitrijević. He joined youth system of Nantes in 1998. He became a professional in 2004. After Nantes, he played for Grenoble, before he returned to his homeland. In Serbia, he played for Rad, where he established himself as one of the best central midfielders in the league. He was brought on loan from Italian Chievo in winter transfer window 2011, but he only managed to play two games. After this unsuccessful international episode, he came back to Serbia to become a new Red Star Belgrade player. He was given number 7 shirt and he signed a contract on 10 June 2011. In April 2013, he became a free agent after managing to cut short his long-term contract due to the club's financial problems.

Sydney FC
On 16 January 2014 it was confirmed that Dimitrijević had signed for Sydney FC of the A-League in Australia. He scored his first goal for the club on 24 October 2014 in the Rd 3 clash against Brisbane Roar which ended 2–0 with Miloš scoring the second.

In this year Dimitrijević won all three of the players player of the year, members player of the year and coaches player of the year becoming the first ever person to win all three.

Miloš was released by Sydney FC on 3 June 2015.

It was announced on 28 July 2015 that Miloš Dimitrejivić had re-signed with Sydney FC for a further two seasons.

On 2 March 2016, Dimitrijević scored an 89th-minute winner against Guangzhou Evergrande in the Asian Champions League.

On 19 October 2016, Dimitrijević scored a free kick in Sydney FC's 3–0 away win against Canberra Olympic at Viking Park in the FFA Cup

On 30 June 2017, Dimitrijević was released by Sydney FC to allow him to move closer to his family.

International career
While he was playing in France, he was part of France U18 team. Then he decided to play for Serbia instead of France, so he was once capped for Serbia U21, and even was invited to play for senior team of Serbia in November 2010, but the injury forced him to miss the match against Bulgaria.

Career statistics

Honours

Club
 Red Star
Serbian Cup (1): 2011–12

 Sydney FC
A-League Premiership: 2016–2017
A-League Championship: 2016–2017

Individual
 Sydney FC
 Club player of the year: 2014–15
 Player's player of the Year: 2014–15
 Members player of the year: 2014–15
 A-League PFA Team of the Season: 2014–15

Trivia
As a resemblance to his father, he is often called Mali Čava.

References

External links

 Miloš Dimitrijević at lfp.fr
 
 Miloš Dimitrijević Stats at utakmica.rs

1984 births
French people of Serbian descent
Serbian footballers
Serbia under-21 international footballers
French footballers
FC Nantes players
Grenoble Foot 38 players
Ligue 1 players
Ligue 2 players
Serie A players
Serbian SuperLiga players
FK Rad players
A.C. ChievoVerona players
Red Star Belgrade footballers
Sydney FC players
A-League Men players
Association football midfielders
Serbian expatriate footballers
Serbian expatriate sportspeople in Italy
Expatriate footballers in Italy
Serbian expatriate sportspeople in France
Expatriate footballers in France
Footballers from Belgrade
Living people